The 2000–01 Bulgarian Cup was the 61st season of the Bulgarian Cup. Litex Lovech won the competition, beating Velbazhd Kyustendil 1–0 in the final at the Stadion Lokomotiv in Sofia.

First round
In this round entered winners from the preliminary round together with the teams from B Group.

|-
!colspan=3 style="background-color:#D0F0C0;" |23 September 2000

|}

Second round
In this round entered winners from the First Round together with the teams from A Group.

Third round

First legs

Second legs

Quarter-finals

First legs

Second legs

Semi-finals

First legs

Second legs

Final

Details

References

2000-01
2000–01 domestic association football cups
Cup